Joliette High School (JHS) is a public anglophone secondary school in Joliette, Quebec. Operated by the Sir Wilfrid Laurier School Board, it is the sole anglophone high school in Lanaudière.  it has about 265 students.

Attendance boundary
Areas assigned to Joliette High include, but are not limited to:
 D'Autray RCM (almost all areas):
 Berthierville, La Visitation-de-l'Île-Dupas, Lanoraie, Lavaltrie, Mandeville, Saint-Barthélemy, Saint-Cléophas-de-Brandon, Saint-Cuthbert, Saint-Gabriel, Saint-Gabriel-de-Brandon, Saint-Ignace-de-Loyola,  Saint-Norbert, Sainte-Élisabeth, Sainte-Geneviève-de-Berthier
Note that Saint-Didace is not in the Joliette High zone

 Joliette RCM (all areas):
 Crabtree, Joliette, Notre-Dame-des-Prairies, Notre-Dame-de-Lourdes, Saint-Ambroise-de-Kildare, Saint-Charles-Borromée, Sainte-Mélanie, Saint-Paul, Saint-Pierre, Saint-Thomas

 Matawinie RCM (southern areas):
 Chertsey, Entrelacs, Rawdon, Saint-Alphonse-Rodriguez, Saint-Côme, Saint-Damien, Saint-Félix-de-Valois, Saint-Jean-de-Matha, Saint-Michel-des-Saints, Saint-Zénon, Sainte-Béatrix, Sainte-Émélie-de-l'Énergie, and Sainte-Marcelline-de-Kildare

 Montcalm RCM (all areas):
 Saint-Alexis, Saint-Calixte, Saint-Esprit, Saint-Jacques, Sainte-Julienne, Saint-Lin-Laurentides, Saint-Liguori, Saint-Roch-de-l'Achigan, Saint-Roch-Ouest, Sainte-Marie-Salomé

References

External links
 Joliette High School

High schools in Quebec